This article lists fellows of the Royal Society elected in 1943.

Fellows

Sir Shanti Swaroop Bhatnagar
Ivan de Burgh Daly
Patrick Alfred Buxton
Sir John Augustine Edgell
Arthur James Ewins
Arthur Felix
Sir Alexander Fleming
Sir John Jacob Fox
William Michael Herbert Greaves
Sydney Cross Harland
George Armand Robert Kon
Sir Andrew McCance
Wilder Penfield
Guy Ellcock Pilgrim
Sir Reginald Edward Stradling
Sir Charles Sykes (metallurgist)
John Lighton Synge
George Frederick James Temple
Alexander Logie Du Toit
Solly Zuckerman, Baron Zuckerman

Foreign members

Victor Moritz Goldschmidt
Bernardo Houssay

References

1943
1943 in science
1943 in the United Kingdom